This is lists of baseball teams that formerly played in the Canadian-American Association of Professional Baseball, also known as the Can-Am League, or any of its two predecessors, the Northeast League or Northern League East Division.

Former teams

League-operated traveling teams

Teams that never played

Canadian American Association of Professional Baseball
+
Defunct independent baseball league teams
Defunct minor league baseball teams